Forest Hall railway station served the village of Forest Hall, Tyne and Wear, England from 1856 to 1958 on the East Coast Main Line.

History 
The station opened as Benton in February 1856 by the North Eastern Railway. It was situated north of the level crossing, behind 'The Flying Scotsman' public house. There were no goods sidings at Forest Hall but the RCH Handbook of Sidings indicates that goods traffic was handled at the station, which may have been small items that could have been dealt with at the passenger platforms. Its name was changed to Forest Hall on 1 December 1874. In 1951, only 1,928 tickets were sold in the year; less than 6 a day. This inevitably lead to the closure of the station on 15 September 1958 to both passengers and goods traffic.

References

External links 

Disused railway stations in Tyne and Wear
Former North Eastern Railway (UK) stations
Railway stations in Great Britain opened in 1856
Railway stations in Great Britain closed in 1958
1856 establishments in England
1958 disestablishments in England